The 2019 NPF College Draft was the 16th annual collegiate draft for the National Pro Fastpitch. It took place April 15, 2019 in Nashville, Tennessee at Acme Feed & Seed, a downtown entertainment venue. It was available for internet viewing via NPFTV, the league's streaming platform. The Chicago Bandits selected Kelly Barnhill from Florida with the first overall pick in the draft.

Draft Selections 

Position key: 
C = catcher; INF = infielder; SS = shortstop; OF = outfielder; UT = Utility infielder; P = pitcher; RHP = right-handed pitcher; LHP = left-handed pitcher
Positions will be listed as combined for those who can play multiple positions.

Round 1

Round 2

Round 3

Round 4

Round 5

Draft notes 
Round 1:

Round 3:

References 

National Pro Fastpitch drafts
Softball in the United States
2019 in softball